In Christian piety, an ejaculation, sometimes known as ejaculatory prayer or aspiration, is "a short prayer, in which the mind is directed to God, on any emergency."  “A sigh, a devout aspiration, a holy ejaculation, will oftener pierce the sky, and reach the ear of Omnipotence, than a long set exercise of prayer...”.

Within Roman Catholicism, some common ejaculations include the Jesus Prayer, the Fatima Prayer of the Holy Rosary, Come Holy Spirit, and Eternal Rest. In Methodism, some common ejaculations include "Praise the Lord!", "Hallelujah!", and "Amen!". The Puritan theologian William Perkins urged his pupils to "pray continually" through "secret and inward ejaculations of the heart". The Lutheran rite for corporate Confession and Absolution includes the pastor offering ejaculatory prayers after penitents recite the Confiteor.

References

Christian prayer
Interjections